Bovidae is a family of hoofed ruminant mammals in the order Artiodactyla. A member of this family is called a bovid. They are widespread throughout Africa, Asia, Europe, and North America, and are found in a variety of biomes, most typically forest, savanna, shrubland, and grassland. Over a billion each of domesticated sheep, cattle, and goats, and over 200 million domesticated water buffalo, 14 million domestic yak, and 300,000 domesticated gayal are used in farming worldwide. Many wild species do not have population estimates, though the impala, springbok, and harnessed bushbuck have population sizes of over one million, while several species of bovid are considered endangered or critically endangered with populations as low as 25. One species, the scimitar oryx, is extinct in the wild, the bluebuck went extinct in the last 200 years, and the aurochs went extinct 400 years ago. A third extinct species, the red gazelle, potentially never existed, and the kouprey is potentially extinct, with no sightings since 1969.

The 146 extant species of Bovidae are split into 52 genera within 8 subfamilies: Aepycerotinae, or the impala; Alcelaphinae, containing the bontebok, hartebeest, wildebeest, and relatives; Antilopinae, containing several antelope, gazelles, and relatives; Bovinae, containing cattle, buffalos, bison, and other antelopes; Caprinae, containing goats, sheep, ibex, serows and relatives; Cephalophinae, or duikers; Hippotraginae, containing the addax, oryx, and relatives; and Reduncinae, or reedbuck and kob antelopes. Extinct species have also been placed into these subfamilies, as well as the extinct Hypsodontinae, Oiocerinae, and Tethytraginae subfamilies. Over one hundred extinct Bovidae species have been discovered, though due to ongoing research and discoveries the exact number and categorization is not fixed.

Conventions

Conservation status codes listed follow the International Union for Conservation of Nature (IUCN) Red List of Threatened Species. Range maps are provided wherever possible; if a range map is not available, a description of the bovid's range is provided. Ranges are based on the IUCN Red List for that species unless otherwise noted. All extinct species or subspecies listed alongside extant species went extinct after 1500 CE, and are indicated by a dagger symbol "".

Classification
The family Bovidae consists of 146 extant species belonging to 52 genera in 8 subfamilies and divided into hundreds of extant subspecies. This does not include hybrid species or extinct prehistoric species. Additionally, the bluebuck went extinct in the last 200 years, and the aurochs went extinct 400 years ago.

 Subfamily Aepycerotinae
 Genus Aepyceros: one species
 Subfamily Alcelaphinae
 Genus Alcelaphus: one species
 Genus Beatragus: one species
 Genus Connochaetes: two species
 Genus Damaliscus: two species
 Subfamily Antilopinae
 Genus Ammodorcas: one species
 Genus Antidorcas: one species
 Genus Antilope: one species
 Genus Dorcatragus: one species
 Genus Eudorcas: five species
 Genus Gazella: ten species
 Genus Litocranius: one species
 Genus Madoqua: four species
 Genus Nanger: three species
 Genus Neotragus: three species
 Genus Oreotragus: one species
 Genus Ourebia: one species
 Genus Procapra: three species
 Genus Raphicerus: three species
 Genus Saiga: one species
 Subfamily Bovinae
 Genus Bison: two species
 Genus Bos: ten species (one extinct)
 Genus Boselaphus: one species
 Genus Bubalus: five species
 Genus Pseudoryx: one species
 Genus Syncerus: one species
 Genus Taurotragus: two species
 Genus Tetracerus: one species
 Genus Tragelaphus: seven species
 Subfamily Caprinae
 Genus Ammotragus: one species
 Genus Arabitragus: one species
 Genus Budorcas: one species
 Genus Capra: nine species
 Genus Capricornis: four species
 Genus Hemitragus: one species
 Genus Naemorhedus: four species
 Genus Nilgiritragus: one species
 Genus Oreamnos: one species
 Genus Ovibos: one species
 Genus Ovis: seven species
 Genus Pantholops: one species
 Genus Pseudois: one species
 Genus Rupicapra: two species
 Subfamily Cephalophinae
 Genus Cephalophus: fifteen species
 Genus Philantomba: three species
 Genus Sylvicapra: one species
 Subfamily Hippotraginae
 Genus Addax: one species
 Genus Hippotragus: three species (one extinct)
 Genus Oryx: four species
 Subfamily Reduncinae
 Genus Kobus: five species
 Genus Pelea: one species
 Genus Redunca: three species

Bovids
The following classification is based on the taxonomy described by Mammal Species of the World (2005), with augmentation by generally accepted proposals made since using molecular phylogenetic analysis.

Subfamily Aepycerotinae

Subfamily Alcelaphinae

Subfamily Antilopinae

Subfamily Bovinae

Subfamily Caprinae

Subfamily Cephalophinae

Subfamily Hippotraginae

Subfamily Reduncinae

Notes

References

Sources

 
 
 
 
 

 
bovidae
bovidae